() is a hillfort dating back to the Iron Age. Evidence suggests the settlement was first built around 200 BC, though most of the archaeological finds date from AD 150–400, showing the site continued as a settlement during the Roman occupation.

 is one of the most spectacular ancient monuments in Wales. Within the walls are ruins of about 150 stone houses, which would have had turf roofs. During Roman times, it may have housed up to 400 people. Historian John Davies suggests that because the settlement is so far above sea level, the huts served as habitations for summer shepherds who also had winter dwellings in the lowlands.

In modern times it was first brought to popular attention by Thomas Pennant in his Tours of Wales. Its location and importance have attracted visitors for years. The hillfort has recently been the site of conservation work and footpath maintenance. An extensive survey was made in 1956.

See also
 List of hillforts in Wales

References

External links

 Tre'r Ceiri webpage (snapshot 16/05/2019 17:07:48) 
 Museum of Wales (snapshot 25/08/2021 15:17:01) 
 Coflein online database for the National Monuments Record of Wales (NMRW)

Llanaelhaearn
Archaeological sites in Gwynedd
Hillforts in Gwynedd
Former populated places in Wales